The St. Charles Borromeo Church is a former Roman Catholic parish church in Woonsocket, Rhode Island, located on North Main Street. The parish of St. Charles was canonically suppressed January 12, 2020 and the congregation merged with that of the Church of All Saints, another parish of the Diocese of Providence, although the church remains open as an alternative worship space.

History

The Gothic Revival-style church was designed by Patrick Keely and built 1867–71 to serve the area's Irish Catholic population.  The complex also includes a clergy house (1881), school (1897), and convent (1868). All were listed on the National Register of Historic Places as St. Charles Borromeo Church Complex in 1983.

See also
 National Register of Historic Places listings in Providence County, Rhode Island

References

External links 

Churches in the Roman Catholic Diocese of Providence
19th-century Roman Catholic church buildings in the United States
Roman Catholic churches completed in 1867
Churches on the National Register of Historic Places in Rhode Island
Buildings and structures in Woonsocket, Rhode Island
Churches in Providence County, Rhode Island
Roman Catholic churches in Rhode Island
National Register of Historic Places in Providence County, Rhode Island
Religious organizations disestablished in 2020
Religious organizations established in 1867
Gothic Revival church buildings in Rhode Island